Rovshan Safarov (born 3 May 1988) is an Azerbaijani Paralympic judoka. He represented Azerbaijan at the 2012 Summer Paralympics and at the 2016 Summer Paralympics and he won one of the bronze medals in the men's 81 kg event in 2016.

At the 2017 Islamic Solidarity Games he won one of the bronze medals in the men's −90 kg event.

References

External links 
 
 

1988 births
Living people
Place of birth missing (living people)
Azerbaijani male judoka
Paralympic judoka of Azerbaijan
Paralympic bronze medalists for Azerbaijan
Paralympic medalists in judo
Judoka at the 2012 Summer Paralympics
Judoka at the 2016 Summer Paralympics
Medalists at the 2016 Summer Paralympics
21st-century Azerbaijani people